Route 95 is a highway in southern Missouri.  Its northern terminus is at Route 32 at Lynchburg in Laclede County. Its southern terminus is at U.S. Route 160 at Lutie about 2.5 miles west of the Theodosia arm of Bull Shoals Lake in Ozark County.  

A short  section forms a wrong-way concurrency with Route 5; Route 95 is marked as "North Route 95" but goes south at this location.

Route description

History
The section of Route 95 north of Wasola to Lutie was originally a section of Route 5A, a branch of Route 5.

Major intersections

References

095
Transportation in Ozark County, Missouri
Transportation in Douglas County, Missouri
Transportation in Wright County, Missouri
Transportation in Laclede County, Missouri